Marie von Najmájer (3 February 1844 in Buda, Hungary – 25 July 1904 in Bad Aussee (Styria), Austria) was an Austrian novelist and poet. She was the daughter of Hungarian royal hofrat Franz von Najmájer. In 1852 she moved to Vienna with her mother. She was an activist of the Association for Women's Education in Vienna (Verein für erweiterte Frauenbildung in Wien).

Works 
 Schneeglöckchen. Gedichte. (A snowdrop. Poems), Wien 1868
 Gedichte. Neue Folge (Poems), Wien 1872
 Gurret-ül-Eyn. (A picture from the Persian modern times in 6 Songs about Baháʼí religious movement), Wien 1874
 Gräfin Ebba. Ein Gedicht (Countess Ebba. A poem), Stuttgart 1877
 Eine Schwedenkönigin (Queen of Sweden. A novel), Breslau 1882
 Johannisfeuer. Eine Dichtung (Midsummer. A poem, Stuttgart 1888
 Neue Gedichte (New poems), Stuttgart 1891
 Der Stern von Navarra. Historischer Roman (The star of Navarra. A historical novel), Berlin 1900.
 Der Göttin Eigenthum (Goddess's possession), Wien 1901
 Kaiser Julian. Trauerspiel in 5 Akten (Emperor Julian. A tragedy), Wien 1904
 Hildegund. Ännchen von Tharau. Der Goldschuh. Dramat. Nachlaß (theatrical legacy), Wien 1907

External links 

 Ariadne Project "Women in Motion" (in German)
 Project: Database of Historical Novels (in German)

1844 births
1904 deaths
19th-century Bahá'ís
20th-century Bahá'ís
Austrian historical novelists
Austrian Bahá'ís
Hungarian Bahá'ís
19th-century Austrian novelists
19th-century Austrian women writers
Women historical novelists
Hungarian nobility
Austro-Hungarian writers
People from the Kingdom of Hungary
People from Buda